Clinton Township is a township in 
Ringgold County, Iowa, USA.

References

Ringgold County, Iowa
Townships in Iowa